Strangers is a science fiction novel by American author Gardner Dozois, published in 1978.

The novel was expanded from its original form as a novella, which first appeared in New Dimensions IV (edited by Robert Silverberg) in 1974. The novella was nominated for both the Hugo and Locus Poll Award, and has since been collected in Dozois's short fiction collection, Strange Days: Fabulous Journeys with Gardner Dozois.

The expanded novel was originally published by Berkley Books, and was nominated for the Nebula Award for Best Novel and the Locus Poll Award. It was reprinted by iBooks in 2003.

External links
Book review

1978 American novels
American science fiction novels
Berkley Books books